The Philippines participated in the 2009 Asian Indoor Games held in Hanoi, Vietnam from October 28 to November 8 with 138 athletes competing in 17 sport events.

Medalists

Gold

Silver

Bronze

Medal summary

By sports

References

 Official site

Nations at the 2009 Asian Indoor Games
Asian Indoor Games
Philippines at the Asian Indoor Games